The 2021–22 BNXT League is the inaugural season of the BNXT League, the highest professional basketball league in Belgium and the Netherlands. It replaces the Dutch Basketball League and the Pro Basketball League.

The season started with the BNXT Supercup on 19 September, while the regular season began on 24 September 2021. The season ended on 11 June 2022 with the final game of the Finals. 

ZZ Leiden won the inaugural BNXT championship. Heroes Den Bosch won the Dutch national championship while Filou Oostende won the Belgian national championship.

Creation
On 10 December 2020, it was announced that the Belgian Pro Basketball League and Dutch Basketball League would merge to form a new multinational league. All clubs from the Dutch DBL voted for, while 9 of 10 teams in Belgium voted in favor of the decision. Serious talks about the initiative had been ongoing since fall 2019. On 20 May 2021, the new name "BNXT League" and logo of the league were revealed.

Competition formula
The league will consist of different stages with national championships and a common BeNeLeague championship.

Teams
All 22 teams from the 2020–21 Dutch Basketball League and 2020–21 Pro Basketball League were awarded licenses to play. Almere Sailors withdrew in August due to the lack of financial resources.

Arenas and locations 

Note: Table lists in alphabetical order.

Personnel and sponsorship

Coaching changes

National Round

Netherlands

Standings

Results

Belgium

Standings

Results

International Round

Elite Gold

Standings

Results

Elite Silver

Standings

Results

National Playoffs
In the national playoffs, quarterfinals will be played best-of-three format (1–1–1), semifinals and finals will be played in a best-of-five format (1-1-1-1–1).

Netherlands

Heroes Den Bosch won its seventeenth national title, ending a 7-year drought, after beating ZZ Leiden in the finals. Thomas van der Mars was named the Finals MVP.

Bracket

Quarterfinals

|}

Semifinals

|}

Finals

|}

Belgium

Bracket

Quarterfinals

|}

Semifinals

|}

Finals

|}

BNXT Playoffs
The highest ranked team before the start of the playoffs always has the home court advantage. This means that they always play the last game of a playoff series or a home and away matchup at home.

First round

|}

Second round

|}

Third round

|}

Fourth round

|}

Quarterfinals

|}

Semifinals

|}

Finals

|}

Individual awards
The individual awards will be given during an award show held in Lint on 30 April 2022.

Statistics
The following were the statistical leaders in the 2021–22 regular season.

Individual statistic leaders

Individual game highs

References

External links
Official website

BNXT League seasons
BNXT